Kazimierz Kropidłowski (16 August 1931 – 20 December 1998) was a Polish long jumper. He was born in Starogard Gdański. He competed at the 1956 Summer Olympics in Melbourne, where he placed sixth in men's long jump.

References

1931 births
1998 deaths
People from Starogard Gdański
Polish male long jumpers
Olympic athletes of Poland
Athletes (track and field) at the 1956 Summer Olympics
Athletes (track and field) at the 1960 Summer Olympics
Sportspeople from Pomeranian Voivodeship
Zawisza Bydgoszcz athletes